Arlington Rand Brooks Jr.  (September 21, 1918 – September 1, 2003) was an American film and television actor.

Early life 
Brooks was born in Wright City, Missouri. He was the son of Arlington Rand Brooks, a farmer. His mother and he moved to Los Angeles when he was four, though he continued to spend summers in Wright City. Brooks continued to make visits to his hometown of Wright City into the 1950s, up to and following the death of his father in 1950.

His mother and his grandfather were actors.

Career

Early career 
After leaving school, Brooks got a screen test at MGM and was given a bit part in Love Finds Andy Hardy (1938). His big fame came with his part as Charles Hamilton in Gone with the Wind (1939), a role which he later admitted he despised; he wanted to play more macho parts. He made $100 per week under contract at MGM, but when he was on loan to Selznick International Pictures for Gone with the Wind, he made $500 per week.

After Gone With the Wind, he had relatively small parts in other movies including Babes in Arms, then a regular role as Lucky in the Hopalong Cassidy series of Westerns in the mid-1940s; Brooks succeeded Russell Hayden in the role. Among the films, which starred William Boyd as Hopalong, were Hoppy's Holiday, The Dead Don't Dream, and Borrowed Trouble. He received positive notice for his work in Fool's Gold, with Variety reporting that he did "an excellent job." In edited, half-hour versions of some of the films, he appeared in 12 of the 52 episodes of the Hopalong Cassidy television series.

Military service 
Brooks served in the United States Army Air Corps during World War II, eventually reaching the rank of sergeant. He trained at Buckley Field in Colorado, in March 1943 and was stationed in Springfield, Missouri, as of May 1943. Brooks was for a time at San Antonio Air Field. He trained for flying, but did some theatre work under General Arnold. He was ill for a time during his service and in 1944 worked in recruitment in Louisiana.

Post-military film and television work 
In 1948, he co-starred with Adele Jergens and Marilyn Monroe in the low-budget, black-and-white Columbia Pictures film, Ladies of the Chorus. Brooks became the first actor to share an on-screen kiss with Monroe, who in a few years was one of the world's biggest movie stars. Filmed in just 10 days, the film was released soon after its completion.

Variety called his performance in the 1952 film The Steel Fist "capable."

Television brought new opportunities, again often in Westerns. He played Cpl. Randy Boone in the 1950s television series, The Adventures of Rin Tin Tin.

Brooks had guest roles in 1950s Western series, including Mackenzie's Raiders, The Lone Ranger, Maverick, Gunsmoke, and Bonanza. He appeared twice on the syndicated adventure series, Rescue 8, as well as on CBS's Perry Mason courtroom drama series.

In 1962, he directed and produced a movie about brave dogs, Bearheart, but the film was entangled in legal troubles due to his business manager's involvement in crimes such as forgery and graft. The film was finally released in 1978, under the title Legend of the Northwest.

Brooks was one of the favorite leading men of Jane Withers.

Post-entertainment career 
After he left show business, Brooks owned and operated a private ambulance company, Professional Ambulance, in Glendale, California. He commented that he "died in more pictures than almost anyone" and that though he was never very big in show business, he was willing to return to it. Brooks sold the ambulance company in 1994, and retired to his ranch in the Santa Ynez Valley, where he bred champion Andalusian horses. He attended a Gone with the Wind reunion for Clark Gable's birthday, along with Ann Rutherford and Fred Crane, in Cadiz, Ohio, in 1992.

Personal life 
Variety reported that Brooks married Clover Barrick on April 18, 1945.

He married Lois Laurel (d. 2017), daughter of Stan Laurel, in 1949. Their son Arlington Rand Brooks III was born in September 1949. Their daughter Laurel was born in August 1950 in Santa Monica, California.

Death
On September 1, 2003, Brooks died in Santa Ynez, California.

Partial filmography

 Hold That Kiss (1938) - Guitar Player in Band (uncredited)
 Love Finds Andy Hardy (1938) - Young Man on Bandstand (uncredited)
 Dramatic School (1938) - Pasquel Jr.
 The Old Maid (1939) - Jim
 Babes in Arms (1939) - Jeff Steele
 Thunder Afloat (1939) - Listener (uncredited)
 Dancing Co-Ed (1939) - Steve (uncredited)
 Balalaika (1939) - Crying Soldier (uncredited)
 Gone with the Wind (1939) - Charles Hamilton - Her Brother
 Laddie (1940) - Peter Dover
 Northwest Passage (1940) - Peter Dover
 And One Was Beautiful (1940) - Joe Havens
 Florian (1940) - Victor
 Girl from Avenue A (1940) - Steve
 Life with Henry (1940) - Daniel Gordon (uncredited)
 The Son of Monte Cristo (1940) - Hans Mirbach
 Jennie (1940) - Karl Schermer
 Cheers for Miss Bishop (1941) - 'Buzz' Wheelwright
 Double Date (1941) - Jerry Baldwin
 The People vs. Dr. Kildare (1941) - Dr. George Young (uncredited)
 Lady Scarface (1941) - James 'Jimmy' Powell
 Niagara Falls (1941) - Honeymooner
 Cowboy Serenade (1942) - Jim Agnew
 The Affairs of Jimmy Valentine (1942)
 Fingers at the Window (1942) - Young Reporter (uncredited)
 The Sombrero Kid (1942) - Philip Martin
 Air Force (1943) - Co-Pilot (uncredited)
 High Explosive (1943) - Jimmy Baker
 Lady in the Dark (1944) - Ben (uncredited)
 Resisting Enemy Interrogation (1944) - Pilot (uncredited)
 The Harvey Girls (1946) - Townsman at Saloon (uncredited)
 The Devil's Playground (1946) - Lucky Jenkins
 The Great Morgan (1946) - Film Character (uncredited)
 Fool's Gold (1946) - Lucky Jenkins
 Unexpected Guest (1947) - Lucky Jenkins
 Dangerous Venture (1947) - Lucky Jenkins
 The Marauders (1947) - Lucky Jenkins
 Hoppy's Holiday (1947) - Lucky Jenkins
 Kilroy Was Here (1947) - Rodney Meadows
 Silent Conflict (1948) - Lucky Jenkins
 The Dead Don't Dream (1948) - Lucky Jenkins
 Sinister Journey (1948) - Lucky Jenkins
 Borrowed Trouble (1948) - Lucky Jenkins
 False Paradise (1948) - Lucky Jenkins
 Strange Gamble (1948) - Lucky Jenkins
 Sundown in Santa Fe (1948) - Tom Wyatt
 Joan of Arc (1948) - Jean d'Arc
 Ladies of the Chorus (1948) - Randy Carroll
 The Wyoming Bandit (1949) - Jimmy Howard
 Black Midnight (1949) - Daniel Jordan
 The Vanishing Westerner (1950) - Sanderson's First Victim
 Riding High (1950) - Henry Early
 Bunco Squad (1950) - Robert (uncredited)
 Heart of the Rockies (1951) - Jim Corley
 Yukon Manhunt (1951) - Len Kaufman
 The Steel Fist (1952) - Capt. Giorg Nicholoff
 The Cimarron Kid (1952) - Emmett Dalton (uncredited)
 Waco (1952) - Henchman Al
 Man from the Black Hills (1952) - Fake Jimmy Fallon
 The Gunman (1952) - Jud Calvert
 Montana Incident (1952) - Dave Connors
 The Maverick (1952) - Trooper Barnham
 Born to the Saddle (1953) - John Grant
 The Charge at Feather River (1953) - Pvt. Adams (uncredited)
 To Hell and Back (1955) - Lt. Harris (uncredited)
 Official Detective (1957, TV Series) - McClellan
 The Challenge of Rin Tin Tin (1958)
 The Last Hurrah (1958) - Votes Tallyman (uncredited)
 Stump Run (1959) - Wayne Lawson
 Comanche Station (1960) - Station Man
 Posse from Hell (1961) - Townsman (uncredited)
 Stagecoach to Dancers' Rock (1962) - Quint Rucker
 The Munsters (Nov 1964) - (Tin-Can man)
 Harlow (1965) - Casting Director (uncredited)
 Requiem for a Gunfighter (1965) - Abe Gentry
 Combat! (1965, TV Series) - G.I. Lieutenant 
 Leather Narcissus (1967)
 In Like Flint (1967) - Missile Control Officer (uncredited)
 Double Indemnity (1973, TV Movie) - Conductor (uncredited)
 The Sex Symbol (1974, TV Movie) - Edward Kelly (final film role)

Notes

References

External links

  Rand Brooks at Find a Grave
Rand Brooks on the RadioGOLDINdex

1918 births
2003 deaths
American male film actors
American male television actors
Ranchers from California
20th-century American male actors
Burials at Forest Lawn Memorial Park (Glendale)
People from Warren County, Missouri
Actors from Missouri
Male Western (genre) film actors
Western (genre) television actors